The 2014 St Albans City and District Council election took place on 22 May 2014 to elect members of St Albans District Council in Hertfordshire, England. One third of the council was up for election and the council stayed under no overall control.

After the election, the composition of the council was:
Conservative 29
Liberal Democrats 17
Labour 10
Green 1
Independent 1

Background
Before the election the Conservatives had half of the seats on the council with 29 councillors, while the Liberal Democrats had 19 seats, Labour had 8 and both the Greens and an independent had 1 seat. 20 seats were contested in 2014 with each of the Conservative, Liberal Democrat and Labour parties putting up a full 20 candidates. The Green party stood 16 candidates, while the UK Independence Party had a big increase in candidates after only standing in 2 wards at the 2012 election.

Election result
The Conservatives remained the largest party on the council with 29 seats, but failed to win a majority on the council. Labour gained 2 seats to have 10 councillors, taking London Colney from the Conservatives and a narrow 32 vote gain in Sopwell from the Liberal Democrats after a recount. The Liberal Democrats dropped to 17 seats and blamed their loss of a seat in St Peters ward to the Conservatives on votes for the Green party, who came a close third in the ward. The UK Independence Party failed to win any seats but came second in Sandridge, and third in St Stephen ward where 2 seats were contested. Overall turnout at the election was 42.77%.

Ward results

By-elections between 2014 and 2015
A by-election was held in Marshalswick South on 29 January 2015 for 2 seats on the council after the resignation of Conservative councillors Heidi Allen and Seema Kennedy. The 2 seats were held for Conservatives by Steve McKeown and Richard Curthoys with 667 and 647 votes respectively.

References

2014 English local elections
2014
2010s in Hertfordshire